= Marrying Young in Indonesia =

2019 book

Marrying Young in Indonesia: Voices, Laws and Practices
- Editor: Mies Grijns, Hoko Horii, Sulistyowati Irianto, and Pinky Saptandari
- Language: English
- Genre: Non-fiction
- Publisher: Yayasan Pustaka Obor Indonesia
- Publication date: 2019
- Pages: 336
- ISBN: 9789814881258

Marrying Young in Indonesia: Voices, Laws and Practices is an anthropology book edited by Mies Grijns, Hoko Horii, Sulistyowati Irianto, and Pinky Saptandari.
